Hiller Crowell Wellman (March 22, 1871 in Boston – February 3, 1956) was an American librarian who served as president of the American Library Association (1914–15). He was librarian for the Springfield (Massachusetts) City Library from 1902 to 1948. Before his tenure in Springfield, Wellman served as librarian at the Brookline Library. In addition, Wellman was special editor for library terms for Webster's New International Dictionary, Second Edition.

Bibliography
 "An Article of Faith" Address delivered before the graduating class of the library school, the New York Public Library, June 6, 1919
 "What the City Library is doing to help win the war" Bulletin of the American Library Association, Volume 12. (1918) p. 57-60
 "President's Address: The Library's Primary Duty" Bulletin of the American Library Association, Volume 9. (1915) p. 89-93

References

 
 

1871 births
1956 deaths
American librarians
Presidents of the American Library Association
People from Boston